Ousset is a surname, likely of French origin. Notable people with the surname include:

Annie Ousset-Krief (born 1954), French historian and professor
Cécile Ousset (born 1936), French pianist
Jean Ousset (1914-1994), French ideologist